Leonard McKeegan (born 1963) is an Irish former hurler who played as a midfielder for the Antrim senior team.

McKeegan made his first appearance for the team during the 1985-86 National League and was a semi-regular member of the starting fifteen for much of the next decade. During that time he played in Antrim's historic 1989 All-Ireland final defeat by Tipperary, but enjoyed little other success on the field of play.

At club level McKeegan enjoyed a lengthy and successful career with the Ruarí Óg Cushendall club.

References

1963 births
Living people
Ruairi Og Cushendall hurlers
Antrim inter-county hurlers